Tuhinje Pyaar Mein is an Indian Sindhi-language drama film directed by Deepak Tripathi and written by Kishor Lalwani. The film was released on 11 January 2019.

Cast 
 OmPraksh Asudani as Vishal
 Dristi Aswani as Ashu
 Srichand Makhija as Dwarkadas
 Seema Motwani as Reshma
 Jatin Udasi as Rishi

References 

2019 films
2019 drama films
Sindhi-language films
Indian drama films